Fast Food (sometimes referred to as Fast Food Dizzy) is the title of two slightly different maze video games in the vein of Pac-Man. Both feature Dizzy an anthropomorphic egg designed by the British-born Oliver Twins. The game was originally released in April 1989 and published by Codemasters. It was the third title to feature Dizzy.

The 8-bit versions of the game were released for the ZX Spectrum, Commodore 64 and Amstrad CPC with mazes of abstract design. The 16-bit versions released for the Amiga, Atari ST and DOS have environments that are identifiable as real-world locations such as gardens, harbours, and graveyards.

Gameplay
Dizzy's aim in each maze is to gather all of the food (burgers, pizzas, etc.): some of the food also moves around the maze, either evading Dizzy or trying to meet him. Dizzy is pursued by four mushroom-like monsters: Bonzo, Wizza, Pippa, and Fido. Power-ups and breakable walls add to the complexity of the game.

Development

The game was playable within three days of work; the developers only took two more weeks to finalize the graphics, interface and music.

The game was originally to be a marketing tool for the Happy Eater chain of restaurants, but this idea was dropped during development and Dizzy was added to the game.

Legacy
A shortened, altered version of the game, entitled Easter Eggstravaganza Dizzy, was made available on Amiga Action and ST Action coverdiscs in May 1993. Completion of this game would give players a code which would allow them to enter a competition in the magazine.

In November 2020, a completely new version of Fast Food (now titled Fast Food Dizzy) was released for the Nintendo Switch. It was developed and published by the Oliver Twins on the FUZE program for the console.

References

External links 

1989 video games
Dizzy (series)
Codemasters games
Amstrad CPC games
ZX Spectrum games
Commodore 64 games
Atari ST games
Amiga games
DOS games
Video games about food and drink
Video games scored by Allister Brimble
Video games scored by David Whittaker
Maze games
Video games developed in the United Kingdom